There have been various proposals for the United States to withdraw from the United Nations, where it is one of the founding members and one of the five permanent members of the United Nations Security Council.

Alabama congressman Mike Rogers has called to leave the UN. Utah state representative Don Bush has claimed that many programs by the supranational entity have violated the US Constitution, such as the implementation of the International Court of Justice and the Law of the Sea Treaty, both of which the United States does not currently endorse.

Under President Donald Trump, the U.S. withdrew from the United Nations Educational, Scientific and Cultural Organization (UNESCO) and United Nations Human Rights Council (UNHRC) in October 2017 and June 2018 respectively. The United States also announced its intention to withdraw from the World Health Organization on July 6, 2020, effective one year later.  However, this was later rescinded by Trump's successor as president Joe Biden.

History 

Opposition to the United Nations and its predecessor, the League of Nations, has existed from the time of formation. At the end of World War I, isolationists in the United States were successful in blocking the U.S. Senate ratification of the Treaty of Versailles negotiated by President Woodrow Wilson and by extension U.S. participation in the League of Nations. The John Birch Society, an anti-communist group founded in 1958, was opposed to US involvement from the society's beginning.  From an early date they had bumper stickers with the slogan "Get the U.S. out of the U.N. and the U.N. out of the U.S.!" Another withdrawal advocate at the time was the National Review, which once editorialized that the UN should be "liquidated".

More recently, on 27 February 2021, the Alabama Republican Party passed a resolution in support of U.S. withdrawal, citing perceived UN support for abortion, disarmament of citizens, climate control policies, and influence from socialist countries.

Public opinion 
According to the polling organization Rasmussen Reports, in the year 2004 a minority of 44% of United States citizens had a favorable view of the United Nations. This number continued to decline steadily, and two years later in 2006 that number had fallen to 31%. As of 2006, 26% of Americans say "the U.S. should not be involved" with the United Nations, with a moderate majority of 57% supporting remaining a member. The 2006 poll surveyed 1,000 adults. A 2008 poll by the Chicago Council on Global Affairs shows that 39% find it "very important" and 21% "not important" to strengthen the U.N. In 2013, a Media and Public Opinion Research Group poll found that 38% of Americans would like less involvement with the UN. Some ranking leaders of the United Nations have suggested that the United States government has been projecting a negative image of the UN, although this allegation is denied by the US. Few observers expect the "U.S. out of U.N." movement to result in the US actually withdrawing for the foreseeable future.

Despite criticisms, the majority of Americans (88%) support active engagement in the United Nations, as evidenced by a non-partisan poll conducted after the 2016 election.

Some controversy occurred in 1992 when U.S. Army medic Michael New protested the United Nations by refusing to wear the U.N. insignia on his uniform during a United Nations Protection Force peacekeeping mission to Macedonia during the Yugoslav Wars. Michael New faced a court martial and was subsequently dishonorably discharged for his disobedience to his commanding officer; to this day he still has the belief that he was correct to refuse service under the United Nations.

Legislation 
In 1997 legislation H.R.1146 was introduced in the United States House of Representatives by Congressman Ron Paul of Texas under the label "American Sovereignty Restoration Act". In addition to withdrawal, the bill also proposed expelling the United Nations Headquarters from its territory within the City of New York and no longer providing the large plurality of funds which the US contributes to the UN annually.

The bill was met with minimal support. Further legislation has been suggested, although none has been organized in the form of a comprehensive bill.  H.R.1146 was reintroduced in every Congressional Session by Rep. Paul from 1997 through 2011. Ron Paul retired from the United States House of Representatives at the start of the 2013-2014 session. At that time, the reintroduction of H.R.1146 was taken up by other representatives: in 2013 by Rep. Paul Broun of Georgia, under the designation H.R.75, and in 2015 by Rep. Mike Rogers of Alabama, under the designation H.R.1205.  In each of these cases, the bill was met with minimal support, and referred to committee with no further action taken. Most recently, in 2017 a similar piece of legislation was introduced by Rep. Rogers, under the designation H.R.193.

Sporadic and ineffectual efforts of a similar nature have been attempted in some state legislatures around the country. For instance, on January 19, 1995 a piece of legislation was introduced by Utah state representative Don Bush titled "The National Security Revitalization Act" which called on the US Congress to restrict participation in UN peacekeeping operations.

It was similar in form to bill H.R. 1146, although it had far more provisions such as a reaffirmation of the US support for NATO, and was therefore not exclusively a withdrawal bill. State representative Bush claimed "I had about 25 legislators that signed up for it and there was a lot of other support. The leadership in the House kept it from coming out on the floor." The bill garnered so little support that it was never brought to a vote, despite an overwhelming partisan advantage for State representative Bush's Republican Party in the Utah state legislature.

Unilateralism 
Unilateralism has had a long history in the United States. In his famous and influential Farewell Address, George Washington, the first President of the United States, warned that the United States should "steer clear of permanent alliances with any portion of the foreign world". Many years later, this approach was labeled as isolationism, but some historians of American diplomacy have long argued that "isolationism" is a misnomer, and that American foreign policy, beginning with Washington, has traditionally been driven by unilateralism. Recent works that have made this argument include Walter A. McDougall's Promised Land, Crusader State (1997) and John Lewis Gaddis's Surprise, Security, and the American Experience (2004). Advocates of American unilateralism argue that other countries should not have "veto power" over matters of U.S. national security. Presidential Candidate John Kerry received heavy political heat after saying, during a presidential debate, that American national security actions must pass a "global test". This was interpreted by Kerry opponents as a proposal to submit American foreign policy to approval by other countries. Proponents of American unilateralism generally believe that a multilateral institution, such as the United Nations, is morally suspect because, they argue, it treats non-democratic, and even despotic, regimes as being as legitimate as democratic countries, and withdrawing from the United Nations would be a symbolic move at further distancing the United States from foreign control.

See also 
 Withdrawal from the United Nations
 Foreign relations of the United States
 United States and the United Nations
 United States withdrawal from the Paris Agreement
 United States withdrawal from the Joint Comprehensive Plan of Action
 List of vetoed United Nations Security Council resolutions

References

External links 
 HR 1146 - legislation proposed to withdraw from the United Nations
 Statistics on the popularity of the United Nations
 Town Hall News "It's time for America to leave the UN"
  American Sovereignty Restoration Act 

Withdrawal
Criticism of the United Nations
Proposals in the United States
Public policy proposals